Bisaya, also known as Southern Bisaya, Brunei Bisaya, Brunei Dusun or Tutong 1, is a Sabahan language spoken in Brunei and Sarawak, Malaysia.

References

External links 
 Kaipuleohone's Robert Blust collection includes materials on Bisaya.

Dusunic languages
Languages of Sabah
Languages of Brunei
Languages of Malaysia